The Delhi Metro is a mass rapid transit (MRT) system serving Delhi and its satellite cities of Ghaziabad, Faridabad, Gurgaon, Noida and Bahadurgarh, in the National Capital Region of India. It is by far the largest and busiest metro rail system in India, and the second oldest after the Kolkata Metro. The system has a mix of underground, at-grade, and elevated stations using both broad-gauge and standard-gauge. Delhi Metro operates over 2,700 trips daily, starting at around 05:30 and ending at 23:30.

Construction started in 1998, and the first elevated section (Shahdara to Tis Hazari) on the Red Line opened on 25 December 2002. The first underground section (Vishwa Vidyalaya – Kashmere Gate) on the Yellow Line opened on 20 December 2004. The development of the network was divided into phases. Phase I with 3 lines was completed by 2006, and Phase II in 2011. Phase III is in the finishing stage and is scheduled to be complete by end of 2022. Construction under Phase IV was formally started on 30 December 2019.

Delhi Metro Rail Corporation Limited (DMRC), a company with equal equity participation from the Government of India and the Government of Delhi, built and operates the Delhi Metro. DMRC was certified by the United Nations in 2011 as the first metro rail and rail-based system in the world to get carbon credits for reducing greenhouse gas emissions, reducing carbon emission levels in the city by 630,000 tonnes every year.

The Delhi Metro also has interchanges with the Rapid Metro Gurgaon (with a shared ticketing system) and Noida Metro. On 22 October 2019, DMRC took over the operations of the financially troubled Rapid Metro Gurgaon. Annual ridership of Delhi metro was 1.79 billion in 2019.

History

Background
The concept of mass rapid transit for New Delhi first emerged from a traffic and travel characteristics study that was carried out in the city in 1969. Over the next several years, many official committees by a variety of government departments were commissioned to examine issues related to technology, route alignment, and governmental jurisdiction. In 1984, the Urban Arts Commission came up with a proposal for developing a multi-modal transport system, which would consist of constructing three underground mass rapid transit corridors as well as augmenting the city's existing suburban railway and road transport networks.

While extensive technical studies and the raising of finance for the project were in progress, the city expanded significantly resulting in a two-fold rise in population and a five-fold rise in the number of vehicles between 1981 and 1998. Consequently, traffic congestion and pollution soared, as an increasing number of commuters took to private vehicles with the existing bus system unable to bear the load. An attempt at privatizing the bus transport system in 1992 merely compounded the problem with inexperienced operators plying poorly maintained, noisy and polluting buses on lengthy routes, resulting in long waiting times, unreliable service, extreme overcrowding, unqualified drivers, speeding and reckless driving which even led to road accidents. To rectify the situation, the Government of India under Prime Minister H.D. Deve Gowda and the Government of Delhi jointly set up a company called the Delhi Metro Rail Corporation (DMRC) on 3 May 1995, with Elattuvalapil Sreedharan as the managing director. 
Sreedharan handed over the charge as managing director of DMRC to Mangu Singh on 31 December 2011.

Initial construction
Physical construction work on the Delhi Metro started on 1 October 1998. After the previous problems experienced by the Kolkata Metro, which was badly delayed and 12 times over budget due to "political meddling, technical problems and bureaucratic delays", DMRC is a special-purpose organisation vested with great autonomy and powers to execute this gigantic project involving many technical complexities, under a difficult urban environment and within a very limited time frame. DMRC was given full powers to hire people, decide on tenders, and control funds. The DMRC then hired the Hong Kong MTRC as a technical consultant on rapid transit operation and construction techniques. As a result, construction proceeded smoothly, except for one major disagreement in 2000, where the Ministry of Railways forced the system to use  broad gauge despite the DMRC's preference for standard gauge.

The first line of the Delhi Metro, the Red Line, was inaugurated by Atal Bihari Vajpayee, the then Prime Minister of India on 24 December 2002. The Delhi Metro became the second underground rapid transit system in India, after the Kolkata Metro, when the Vishwa Vidyalaya–Kashmere Gate section of the Yellow Line opened on 20 December 2004. This underground line was inaugurated by the then Prime Minister Manmohan Singh. The first phase of the project was eventually completed in 2006, on budget and almost three years ahead of schedule, an achievement described by Business Week as "nothing short of a miracle".

Phase I 

Phase II 
At the end of Phases I and II, the cumulative total length of the network became  with 145 stations progressively becoming operational from 4 June 2008 to 27 August 2011.

Phase III 

Phase-I (Red, Yellow and Blue lines) and phase II (Green, Violet, and Airport Express lines) focused on adding new radial lines to expand the network. To further reduce congestion and improve connectivity, Phase III included 8 extensions to the existing lines as well as building two ring lines (Pink and Magenta lines) along with the Grey line. The 3 new lines of Phase-III are the Pink Line running on Inner Ring Road (Line 7), the Magenta Line running on Outer Ring Road (Line 8) & the Grey Line connecting Dwarka and Najafgarh (Line 9).

Work on Phase III started in 2011, with 2016 being the planned deadline. More than 20 tunnel boring machines were used simultaneously to expedite the work; however, the actual work for the original was completed in March 2019 (except for a small stretch due to non-availability of land). Later, certain small extensions to the Delhi Metro were added as part of the Phase–III project, only one of which is still under construction (Dwarka Sector 21 to ECC Centre). Phase III was expected to be completed by the end of 2020 but construction was delayed due to the COVID-19 pandemic. It was finally completed on 18 September 2021 with the opening of the Grey Line extension from Najafgarh to Dhansa Bus Stand.

The expected daily ridership of the whole network of all phases, after the completion of Phase-III, was estimated at 53.47 lakh passengers. Against this, however, the actual ridership of DMRC was 27.79 lakh only (2019–20), i.e. 51.97 percent of the projected ridership. The actual ridership of the Phase III corridors was 4.38 lakh only as against the projected ridership of 20.89 lakh in 2019–20, which is a deficit of 79.02 percent.
The communication-based train control (CBTC) being used in Phase-III trains enables trains to run at a short headway of 90 seconds, although the actual headway between trains is kept much higher because of the relatively low demand on the new corridors. Keeping the short headway and other constraints in mind, DMRC changed its decision to build 9-car-long stations for new lines and instead opted for shorter stations which can accommodate 6-car trains.

Construction accidents
On 19 October 2008, a launching gantry and a part of the overhead Blue Line extension under construction in Laxmi Nagar, East Delhi, collapsed and fell on passing vehicles underneath. Workers were using a crane to lift a 400-tonne concrete span of the bridge when the gantry collapsed along with a  span of the bridge on top of a Blueline bus, killing the driver and a labourer.

On 12 July 2009, a section of a bridge collapsed while it was being erected at Zamrudpur, near East of Kailash, on the Central Secretariat – Badarpur corridor. Six people died and 15 were injured. The following day, on 13 July 2009, a crane that was removing the debris collapsed, and with a bowling pin effect collapsed two other nearby cranes, injuring six. On 22 July 2009, a worker at Ashok Park Metro station was killed when a steel beam fell on him. Over a hundred people, including 93 workers, have died since work on the metro began in 1998.

On 23 April 2018, five people were injured when an iron girder fell off the elevated section of a Metro rail structure being constructed at the Mohan Nagar intersection in Ghaziabad. A car, an auto rickshaw, and a motorbike were also damaged in the accident.

Network

The Delhi Metro is being built in phases. The inauguration of the Dwarka–Barakhamba Road corridor of the Blue Line marked the completion of Phase I in October 2006.
Phase IV project's routes with 6 lines totaling  were finalized in July 2015. It is planned to be completed by 2025.

Lines

Red Line (Line 1)

It is partly elevated and partly at grade and crosses the Yamuna River between Kashmere Gate and Shastri Park stations. The inauguration of the first stretch between Shahdara and Tis Hazari on 24 December 2002 caused the ticketing system to collapse due to the line being crowded to four times its capacity by citizens eager to have a ride. Subsequent sections were inaugurated from Tis Hazari – Trinagar (later renamed Inderlok) on 4 October 2003, Inderlok – Rithala on 31 March 2004, and Shahdara – Dilshad Garden on 4 June 2008. The red line has interchange stations, at Kashmere Gate with the Yellow Line and Violet Line, at Inderlok with the Green Line & at Netaji Subhash Place & Welcome with the Pink Line. In the future the red line will have an interchange with the Blue Line at Mohan Nagar. Beginning 24 November 2013, a total of six-coach trains were eventually commissioned on the Red Line.
On 8 March 2019, an extension of the line from Dilshad Garden to Shaheed Sthal(New Bus Adda) was opened to the public. In November 2022, Delhi Metro introduced a set of two eight-coach trains on its Red Line, which were converted from the existing fleet of 39 six-coach trains.

Yellow Line (Line 2)

The Yellow Line was the second line of the Metro and was the first underground line to be opened on the Delhi Metro. The northern and southern parts of the line are elevated, while the central section which passes through some of the most congested parts of Delhi is underground. The first underground section of Delhi Metro between Vishwa Vidyalaya and Kashmere Gate opened on 20 December 2004, and the subsequent sections of Kashmere Gate – Central Secretariat opened on 3 July 2005, and Vishwa Vidyalaya – Jahangirpuri on 4 February 2009.

On 21 June 2010, an additional stretch from Qutab Minar to HUDA City Centre was opened, initially operating separately from the mainline. However, Chhatarpur station on this line opened on 26 August 2010. Due to delays in acquiring the land for constructing the station, it was constructed using prefabricated structures in a record time of nine months and is the only station in the Delhi Metro network to be made completely of steel. The connecting link between Central Secretariat and Qutub Minar opened on 3 September 2010.

On 10 November 2015, the line was further extended between Jahangirpuri and Samaypur Badli in Outer Delhi. Interchanges are available with the Red Line and Kashmere Gate ISBT at Kashmere Gate, Blue Line at Rajiv Chowk, Violet Line at Kashmere Gate & Central Secretariat, Airport Express at New Delhi, Pink Line at Azadpur & Dilli Haat - INA, Magenta Line at Hauz Khas, Rapid Metro Gurgaon at Sikanderpur and with the Indian Railways network at Chandni Chowk and New Delhi.

The Yellow Line is the first line of Delhi Metro which has phased out all four coach trains with six and eight-coach configurations. The Metro Museum at Patel Chowk metro station, the only museum about metro railway in South Asia, is a collection of display panels, historical photographs and exhibits, tracing the genesis of the Delhi Metro. The museum was opened on 1 January 2009.

Blue Line (Line 3 & Line 4) 

The Blue Line was the third line of the Metro to be opened and the first to connect areas outside Delhi. The first section of this line between Dwarka and Barakhamba Road was inaugurated on 31 December 2005, and subsequent sections opened between Dwarka – Dwarka Sector 9 on 1 April 2006, Barakhamba Road – Indraprastha on 11 November 2006, Indraprastha – Yamuna Bank on 10 May 2009, Yamuna Bank – Noida City Centre on 12 November 2009, and Dwarka Sector 9 – Dwarka Sector 21 on 30 October 2010. This line crosses the Yamuna River between Indraprastha and Yamuna Bank stations, and has India's second extradosed bridge across the Northern Railways mainlines near Pragati Maidan.

A branch of the Blue line, inaugurated on 8 January 2010, takes off from Yamuna Bank station and runs for  up to Anand Vihar in east Delhi. It was further extended up to Vaishali which was opened to the public on 14 July 2011. On 9 March 2019, a  extension of the line from Noida City Centre to Noida Electronic City was opened for public by Prime Minister Narendra Modi. Interchanges are available with the Noida Sector 51 station of Aqua Line (Noida Metro) at Noida Sector 52 station, Yellow Line at Rajiv Chowk station, Green Line at Kirti Nagar, Violet Line at Mandi House, Airport Express at Dwarka Sector 21, Pink Line at Rajouri Garden, Mayur Vihar Phase-I, Karkarduma & Anand Vihar, Magenta Line at Janakpuri West & Botanical Garden and with the Indian Railways network and Interstate Bus Station (ISBT) at Anand Vihar station, which connects with Anand Vihar Railway Terminal and Anand Vihar ISBT. In the future it will have an interchange with the Red Line at Mohan Nagar.

Green Line (Line 5) 

Opened in 2010, Green Line (Line 5) is the fifth line of the Delhi Metro network and the first line on standard gauge, as opposed to previous broad gauge lines. It runs between Inderlok (a station on the Red Line) and Brigadier Hoshiyar Singh with a branch line connecting the line's Ashok Park Main station with Kirti Nagar station on the Blue Line. The completely elevated line, built as part of Phase II of the Delhi Metro runs mostly along the busy NH 10 route in West Delhi. This line also has the country's first standard-gauge maintenance depot at Mundka.

The line was opened in two stages, with the  Inderlok – Mundka section opening on 3 April 2010 and the  Kirti Nagar – Ashok Park Main branch line on 27 August 2011. On 6 August 2012, in a step that will improve commuting in National Capital Region, the Union Government approved an extension of the Delhi Metro from Mundka to Bahadurgarh in Haryana. The  metro stretch has seven stations at Mundka Industrial Area, Ghevra, Tikri Kalan, Tikri Border, Pandit Shree Ram Sharma, Bahadurgarh City and Brigadier Hoshiyar Singh between Mundka and Bahadurgarh. This stretch was opened on 24 June 2018.
Interchanges are available with Red Line at Inderlok, Blue Line at Kirti Nagar and Pink Line at Punjabi Bagh West.

Violet Line (Line 6) 

The Violet Line is the sixth line of the Metro to be opened, and the second standard-gauge corridor after the Green Line. The  line connects Raja Nahar Singh in Ballabgarh via Faridabad to Kashmere Gate in New Delhi, with  being overhead and the rest underground. The first section between Central Secretariat and Sarita Vihar was inaugurated on 3 October 2010, just hours before the inaugural ceremony of the 2010 Commonwealth Games, and connects the Jawaharlal Nehru Stadium, which was the venue for the opening and closing ceremonies of the event. Completed in just 41 months, it includes a  bridge over the Indian Railways mainlines and a  cable-stayed bridge across an operational road flyover and connects several hospitals, tourist attractions, and a major industrial estate along its route. Services are provided at intervals of 5 min. An interchange with the Yellow Line is available at Central Secretariat through an integrated concourse. On 14 January 2011, the remaining portion from Sarita Vihar to Badarpur was opened for commercial service, adding three new stations to the network and marking the completion of the line.

The section between Mandi House and Central Secretariat was opened on 26 June 2014. After that, a  section between ITO and Mandi House was opened on 8 June 2015. A  extension southwards till Escorts Mujesar in Faridabad was inaugurated by Prime Minister Narendra Modi on 6 September 2015. All the nine Metro stations of the Badarpur – Escorts Mujesar (Faridabad) section of Delhi Metro's Phase 3, have been awarded the highest possible rating (platinum) for adherence to green building norms, by the Indian Green Building Council (IGBC), which has devised a rating mechanism for Metro stations and buildings on a scale of platinum, gold, silver etc. for following the green building specifications. The awards for these stations were given to DMRC's Managing Director Mangu Singh by P C Jain, Chairperson of IGBC in the presence of DMRC's directors and senior officials on 10 September 2015.

Currently, the Faridabad corridor of Delhi Metro Violet Line is the longest metro corridor outside of Delhi, consisting of 11 stations and the total length of corridor being . On 28 May 2017, the ITO – Kashmere Gate corridor of the Delhi Metro was formally flagged off for passenger services by the Union Minister of Urban Development, Venkaiah Naidu and the Chief Minister of Delhi, Arvind Kejriwal. This section which runs underground is popularly known as the Heritage Line. Interchanges are available with Red Line at Kashmere Gate, Yellow Line at Kashmere Gate & Central Secretariat, Blue Line at Mandi House, Pink Line at Lajpat Nagar & Magenta Line at Kalkaji Mandir.

Airport Express Line 

The line was operated by Delhi Airport Metro Express Pvt. Limited (DAMEL), a subsidiary of Reliance Infrastructure, the concessionaire of the line till 30 June 2013 and is now being operated by DMRC. The line was constructed at a cost of
, of which Reliance Infrastructure invested  and will pay fees on a revenue-share model. The line has six stations (Dhaula Kuan and Delhi Aerocity became operational on 15 August 2011), with some featuring check-in facilities, parking, and eateries.

Originally scheduled to open before the 2010 Commonwealth Games, the line failed to obtain the mandatory safety clearance and was opened on 24 February 2011, after a delay of around 5 months. After 16 months of commencement of operations, the line was shut down for repairs of the viaducts on 8 July 2012. The line reopened on 22 January 2013. On 27 June 2013 Reliance Infrastructure Ltd intimated DMRC that they are unable to operate the line beyond 30 June 2013. Following this DMRC took over operations of Airport Express line from 1 July 2013 with an Operations and Maintenance team of 100 officials to handle the line. In Jan 2015, DMRC reported that Airport Metro has recorded about 30 percent rise in its ridership following the fare reduction of up to 40 percent in July last year On 14 September 2015 DMRC announced to reduce fares even further to improve the ridership of the line, the new fare structure will have maximum fare of ₹60 and minimum of ₹10 instead of ₹100 and ₹20 charged earlier, a reduction of about 40%. DMRC has stated that this was done to reduce the crowding on Blue line, diverting some of the Dwarka-bound passengers to Airport Express Line, which is underutilised and faster compared to the Blue Line.

Interchanges are available with Yellow Line at New Delhi, Blue Line at Dwarka Sector 21, Durgabai Deshmukh South Campus metro station of Pink Line at Dhaula Kuan & with the Indian Railways network at New Delhi.

A proposed expansion into the ECC Centre in Dwarka Sector 25 is expected to be completed between 2023.

Pink Line (Line 7) 

The Pink Line is the second new line of the third phase of the Delhi Metro. It was partially opened on 14 March 2018, with a further extension opening on 6 August 2018. On 31 October 2018, Trilokpuri Sanjay Lake to Shiv Vihar section was opened. On 31 December 2018, Lajpat Nagar to Mayur Vihar Pocket I section opened. The final section between Mayur Vihar Pocket I and Trilokpuri Sanjay Lake was opened on 6 August 2021 after being previously delayed due to land acquisition and rehabilitation issues.

The Pink Line consists of 38 metro stations from Majlis Park to Shiv Vihar, both in North Delhi. It is mostly elevated and covers Delhi in an almost 'U' shaped pattern. The Pink Line is also known as the Ring Road Line, as the entire line passes alongside the busy Ring Road in Delhi, which witnesses massive traffic jams every day.

The Pink line has interchanges with most of the operational lines of the network such as the Red Line at Netaji Subhash Place & Welcome, Yellow Line at Azadpur & Dilli Haat - INA, Blue Line at Rajouri Garden, Mayur Vihar Phase-I, Anand Vihar & Karkarduma, Green Line at Punjabi Bagh West, Dhaula Kuan of Airport Express at Durgabai Deshmukh South Campus, Violet Line at Lajpat Nagar, as well as with Hazrat Nizamuddin and Anand Vihar Terminal (Indian Railways) and the ISBT's at Anand Vihar and Sarai Kale Khan.

Magenta Line (Line 8) 

The Magenta Line is the first new line of the Third Phase of the Delhi Metro that was partially opened on 25 December 2017 between Botanical Garden and Kalkaji Mandir. The entire length of the line was inaugurated on 28 May 2018.

It consists of 25 metro stations from Janakpuri West to Botanical Garden. The Magenta Line provide direct connectivity to Terminal 1D of Indira Gandhi International Airport. The Magenta line has interchanges with the Yellow Line at Hauz Khas, Blue Line at Janakpuri West and Botanical Garden, and Violet Line at Kalkaji Mandir of the Delhi Metro network.

India's first ever fully-automated driverless train service was started on Magenta line in December 2020.

Grey Line (Line 9) 

The Grey Line (also known as Line 9) is the shortest route in the system. It connects Dwarka to Dhansa Bus Stand in the western part of Delhi. The line has an interchange with Blue Line at Dwarka Station. The Najafgarh to Dwarka section was opened to the public on 4 October 2019. The extension to Dhansa Bus Stand was scheduled to open in December 2020, but construction got delayed due to the COVID-19 pandemic, and was subsequently inaugurated on 18 September 2021.

Expansion

Phase IV 

Delhi Metro was planned to be built in phases spread over approximately 20 years with each phase having a target of five years to be completed and the end of one phase marking the beginning of another. Phase I and Phase II were completed in 2006 and 2011, respectively. Phase-III, totaling , was mostly completed on 5 April 2019, except for a small section of the Pink Line between the Mayur Vihar Pocket 1 and Trilokpuri Sanjay Lake stations as well as the Grey Line extension from Najafgarh to Dhansa Bus Stand, which opened on 6 August 2021 and 18 September 2021, respectively.

Approval from Government of India was received for 3 priority corridors in March 2019. Construction work on these 3 priority corridors having a length of  commenced on 30 December 2019, with an expected completion date of 2025. This may make Delhi Metro the 7th longest metro system by route length after Shanghai metro Beijing Subway, Guangzhou Metro  Shenzhen Metro, Chengdu MetroHangzhou Metro.

Proposed Phase V
Former managing director of DMRC E. Sreedharan stated that by the time Phase IV is completed, the city will need Phase V to cope with the rising population and transport needs. Planning work for Phase V has not started. However, the following corridors, while not specifically tied or approved to any expansion phase have been suggested to be constructed in the near future:

Haryana and UP connectivity

Haryana projects 

Narela to Sonipat - approved: An extension of Red Line. In June 2017, the Government of Haryana's cabinet approved the investment of INR 968.20 crore (US$150 million), as its share on the 80:20 equity ratio with the Union Government, for the  extension of Delhi Metro from the existing Rithala metro station to Sonipat via Bawana with three elevated stations at Sector 5 of Narela in Delhi, on Delhi border at Kundli Industrial Area and Nathupur Industrial Area in Sonipat, which are planned to be built as part of Phase IV.
This link would start at HUDA City Centre and move towards Sector 45, Cyber Park, district shopping centre, Sector 47, Subhash Chowk, Sector 48, Sector 72 A, Hero Honda Chowk, Udyog Vihar Phase 6, Sector 10, Sector 37, Basai village, Sector 9, Sector 7, Sector 4, Sector 5, Ashok Vihar, Sector 3, Bajghera Road, Palam Vihar Extension, Palam Vihar, Sector 23 A, Sector 22, Udyog Vihar Phase 4, Udyog Vihar Phase 5 and finally merge in existing Metro network of Rapid Metro Gurgaon at Moulsari Avenue station near Cyber City.
HUDA City Centre to Manesar City - approved: An extension of Yellow Line, included in the Gurgaon Masterplan 2031, approved by the Haryana govt will go up to Panchgaon Chowk in Manesar, where it will interchange with Delhi–Alwar Regional Rapid Transit System, Western Peripheral Expressway's Multimodal Transit Centre and Jhajjar-Palwal rail line.
Brigadier Hoshiyar Singh – Rohtak City: A Green Line extension. As of July 2017, proposed only and not yet approved.
Dhansa Bus Stand – Jhajjar City: A Grey Line extension, proposed only and not yet approved.

Uttar Pradesh (UP) projects 
Shiv Vihar – Loni: Proposed only, not approved.
The line is envisioned to be completed by 2025 and will connect with the Noida Metro.

Operations

The trains operate at a frequency of one to two minutes to five to ten minutes between 05:00 and 00:00, depending upon the peak and off-peak hours. Automated station announcements are recorded in Hindi and English. Many stations have services such as ATMs, food outlets, cafés, convenience stores and mobile recharge. Eating, drinking, smoking, and chewing gum are prohibited in the entire system. The Metro also has a sophisticated fire alarm system for advance warning in emergencies, and fire retardant material is used in trains as well as on the premises of stations. Navigation information is available on Google Maps. Since October 2010, the first coach of every train is reserved for women. However, last coaches are also reserved when the train changes tracks at the terminal stations in the Red, Green and Violet Lines. To make travelling by metro a smoother experience, Delhi Metro has launched its own official mobile app Delhi Metro Rail for smartphone users,(iPhone and Android) that will provide information on various facilities like the location of the nearest metro station, fare, parking availability, tourist spots near metro stations, security and emergency helpline numbers.

Security

Security on the Delhi Metro is handled by CISF Unit DMRC of Central Industrial Security Force (CISF), who have been guarding the system ever since they took over from the Delhi Police in 2007. Closed-circuit cameras are used to monitor trains and stations, and feed from these is monitored by both the CISF and Delhi Metro authorities at their respective control rooms. Over 7000 CISF personnel have been deployed for security of metro and its installations in addition to metal detectors, X-ray baggage inspection systems, and dog squads which are used to secure the system. To deal with law and order issues in the system, 18 Delhi Metro Rail Police (A dedicated wing of Delhi Police) stations have been established.  About 5,200 CCTV cameras have been installed, which cover every nook and corner of each Metro station. Each of the underground stations has about 45 to 50 cameras installed while the elevated stations have about 16 to 20 cameras each. The monitoring of these cameras is done by the CISF, which is in charge of the security of the Metro, as well as the Delhi Metro Rail Corporation. Intercoms are provided in each train car for emergency communication between the passengers and the train operator. Periodic security drills are carried out at stations and on trains to ensure the preparedness of security agencies in emergency situations.
DMRC is also looking at raising the station walls and railings for the safety of passengers.

Ticketing and recharge

Delhi Metro's fares were last revised and went into effect on 10 October 2017 based on the recommendation of the 4th Fare Fixation Committee in May 2016. For convenience, Delhi Metro commuters have five choices for ticket purchase. These are: 

Fares are calculated based on the distance between the origin and destination stations. They were last revised by DMRC in October 2017.

Smart card: Smart cards are available for longer durations and are the most convenient for frequent commuters. A 10% discount is given on all travel made on it. An additional 10% discount is given to travel card holders for entering the metro system in off-peak hours i.e. From the start of revenue services to 800 hours, from 1200 hours to 1700 hours, and after 2100 hours to the end of metro service in the night. This additional discount is given only on Weekdays i.e. from Monday to Saturday. A deposit of  needs to be made to buy a new card which is refundable on the return of the card any time before its expiry if the card is not physically damaged. For women commuters, Delhi government had proposed a fare exemption scheme, i.e., that women could ride free all across all of Delhi Metro's network. However, this proposal was shot down by the DMRC. 
 A common ticketing facility that allowed commuters to use smart cards in both  Delhi Transport Corporation (DTC) buses and the metro was rolled out on 28 August 2018, under the 'common mobility card' project.

Tourist card: Tourist cards can be used for unlimited travel on the Delhi Metro network over short periods of time. There are two kinds of tourist cards valid for one and three days respectively.

National Common Mobility Card: Part of the 'One Nation, One Card' policy of the Government of India, the National Common Mobility Card is an inter-operable transport card that enables the user to pay for travel, toll duties (toll tax), retail shopping and withdraw money. It is enabled through the RuPay card mechanism. The NCMC was commissioned on the Delhi Metro network on 28 December 2020 and currently, can only be used to pay fares on the Airport Express Line. The DMRC plans to makes the entire Delhi Metro network NCMC compliant by June 2023.

QR code based ticketing: A Delhi Metro QR ticket is a mobile-based ticket that allows people to travel from one destination to another, just like the conventional token or recharge card. The ticket can be bought online using the RIDLR app. For entry and exit, the QR ticket has to be scanned at the QR scanner of the AFC gates. Similar to mobile-based tickets, there are also paper-based QR tickets that can be bought from the station itself. For entry and exit, the QR ticket has to be scanned at the QR scanner of the AFC gates.

Problems

As the network has expanded, high ridership in new trains has led to increasing instances of overcrowding and delays on the Delhi Metro. To alleviate the problem, 8 coach trains have been introduced in Yellow line and Blue line and an increase in the frequency of trains has been proposed. Infrequent, overcrowded and erratic feeder bus services connecting stations to nearby localities have also been reported as an area of concern. While the quality and the cleanliness of the Delhi Metro was lauded, the rising cost of fares have been routinely criticized, with fares being much more expensive compared to the bus services the metro replaced. One recent study has named the fares of the Delhi Metro as one of the world's most unaffordable among the metros that charge more than US$0.5 per ride. Another study finds that Delhi Metro may also have a low ridership problem compared to its size and may not be generating the amount of traffic a metro system generates.

Feeder buses
DMRC operates around 291 electric feeder buses on 42 routes connecting 54 metro stations in Delhi. Around two hundred thousand people use the feeder bus service on a daily basis. Timings of Feeder Bus operation are 08:00 Hours to 20:00 Hours at a frequency of 10 to 15 minutes depending upon Road Traffic density. However, if an operator wishes he can operate before/beyond these hours. At present Metro, Feeder Bus Depots are located at Shastri Park, Kohat Enclave, Janakpuri West, Dwarka Sector-9, Chhatarpur, Yamuna Bank, Azadpur.

Ridership
Delhi Metro had a continuous increase in ridership since its inception up to FY 2016–17. When Metro services were introduced in 2002, the average ridership was 80,000 passengers per day. In FY 2016–17, average daily ridership rose to 28 lakh (2.8 million). Ridership declined in 2017-18 and marginally increased in 2018-19, following fare increases. The highest number of passengers in a single day was reached on 30 July 2019, with 51.6 lakh (5.16 million) trips on the network. In FY 2019–20, the average daily ridership was 27.8 lakhs (2.78 million).

Delhi Metro was suspended on 25 March 2020 due to COVID-19 pandemic, and operations were restarted on 12 September 2020, resulting in a decline in average daily ridership to 8.78 lakhs (0.88 million) in FY 2020–21.

* Including Rapid Metro Gurgaon

Finances

Summary financials

Source:

Delhi Metro has been operating with a loss on an EBT basis since 2010, although the loss has reduced after 2015–16. EBITDA margin declined from 73% in Fiscal 2007 to 27% in Fiscal 2016–17 before improving to 30% in 2017–18. In 2014, Delhi Metro started a semi-naming policy of metro stations, awarded through an open e-tendering process, to generate non-fare revenues.

Funding and capitalisation

DMRC is owned equally by the Government of National Capital Territory of Delhi and the Government of India.
 
The cost of the debt is 0% for Union Government and Delhi Government loans and between 0.01% and 2.3% for Japan International Cooperation Agency (JICA) loans. Of the equity capital as of 31 March 2016,  is paid-up capital, and the rest is reserves and surplus.

Depots 
Delhi Metro currently has 15 operational depots.

Rolling stock

The Delhi Metro uses the rolling stock of two different gauges. Phase I lines use  broad gauge rolling stock, while three Phase II lines use  rolling stock. Trains are maintained at seven depots at Khyber Pass and Sultanpur for the Yellow Line, Mundka for the Green Line, Najafgarh and Yamuna Bank for the Blue Line, Shastri Park for the Red Line, and Sarita Vihar for the Violet Line.

Maglev trains were initially considered for some lines of Phase 3, but DMRC decided to continue with conventional rail in August 2012.

As on 31 March 2015, the company has a total of 1,306 coaches (220 trains). Apart from extensions on various existing lines, two new lines viz. Lines 7 & 8 are proposed in Phase III. 486 coaches (81 six-car trains) being procured for these two new lines will have an advanced feature in Unattended Train Operation (UTO). Additional 258 broad gauge (BG) coaches for Lines 1 to 4 and 138 standard gauge (SG) coaches for Lines 5 & 6 are proposed to be procured for augmentation/extensions to cater to the increased traffic. Resultantly, at the end of Phase III, there would be 2,188 coaches (333 trains). Barring a few 4-car trains on Line 5, 93% of the trains would operate either in 6-car or 8-car configuration at the end of Phase III.

Broad gauge

The rolling stock is manufactured by two major suppliers. For Phase I, the rolling stock was supplied by a consortium of companies comprising Hyundai Rotem, Mitsubishi Corporation, and MELCO. The coaches have a very similar look to MTR Rotem EMU, but there are only 4 doors and sliding doors are used instead of plug doors. The coaches were initially built in South Korea by ROTEM, then in Bangalore by BEML through a technology transfer arrangement. These trains consist of four  stainless steel lightweight coaches with vestibules permitting movement throughout their length and can carry up to 1,500 passengers, with 50 seated and 330 standing passengers per coach. The system is extensible up to eight coaches, and platforms have been designed accordingly.

While initial trains were made in Görlitz, Germany and Sweden, the remainder will be built at Bombardier's factory in Savli, near Vadodara. These trains are a mix of four-car and six-car consists, capable of accommodating 1178 and 1792 commuters per train respectively. The coaches possess several improved features like Closed Circuit Television (CCTV) cameras with eight-hour backup for added security, charging points in all coaches for cell phones and laptops, improved air conditioning to provide a temperature of  even in packed conditions and heaters for winter.

Standard gauge

The standard gauge rolling stock is manufactured by BEML at its factory in Bangalore. Most of these trains are supplied to BEML by Hyundai Rotem. The trains are four-car consists with a capacity of 1,506 commuters per train, accommodating 50 seated and 292 standing passengers in each coach.

Airport Express

Eight 6-car trains supplied by CAF Beasain were imported from Spain. CAF held 5% equity in the DAME project, and Reliance Infrastructure held the remaining 95% before DMRC took over the operations. The trains on this line are of a premium standard compared to the existing metro trains and have inbuilt noise reduction and padded fabric seats. The coaches are equipped with LCD screens for the entertainment of the passengers and also provide flight information for the convenience of air travellers. The trains are fitted with an event recorder which can withstand high levels of temperature and impact and the wheels have a flange lubrication system for less noise and better riding comfort.

Signalling and telecommunication

The Delhi Metro uses cab signalling along with a centralised automatic train control system consisting of automatic operation, protection and signalling modules. A 380 MHz digital trunked TETRA radio communication system from Motorola Solutions is used on all lines to carry both voice and data information. For the Blue Line, Siemens supplied the electronic interlocking Sicas, the operation control system Vicos OC 500 and the automation control system LZB 700 M. An integrated system comprising optical fibre cable, on-train radio, CCTV, and a centralised clock and public address system is used for telecommunication during train operations as well as emergencies. For Red and Yellow lines ALSTOM has supplied signalling system and for the Green and Violet lines, Bombardier Transportation supplied its CITYFLO 350 signalling system.

The Airport Express line introduced WiFi services at all stations along the route on 13 January 2012. Connectivity inside metro trains travelling on the route is expected in the future. The WiFi service is provided by YOU Broadband and Cable India Limited. In August 2017, Wifi service was launched at all the 50 stations under Blue Line.

A fully automated, operator-less train system has been offered to Delhi Metro by the French defense and civilian technologies major Thales.

Environment and aesthetics

The Delhi Metro has won awards for environmentally friendly practices from organisations including the United Nations, RINA, and the International Organization for Standardization, becoming the second metro in the world, after the New York City Subway, to be ISO 14001 certified for environmentally friendly construction. Most of the Metro stations on the Blue Line conduct rainwater harvesting as an environmental protection measure. It is also the first railway project in the world to earn carbon credits after being registered with the United Nations under the Clean Development Mechanism, and has so far earned 400,000 carbon credits by saving energy through the use of regenerative braking systems on its trains. To reduce its dependence on non-renewable sources of energy, DMRC is looking forward to harnessing solar energy and install solar panels at the Karkarduma, Noida Sector-21, Anand Vihar and Pragati Maidan Metro stations and DMRC's residential complex at Pushp Vihar. As of March 2017, the DMRC has commissioned 20 MWp (megawatt peak) of solar power plants across 21 locations on the metro network. This is planned to increase to 31 MWp by March 2018, and 50 MWp by 2021. 60% of the system's daytime power demand is met by the Rewa Ultra Mega Solar park.

The Metro has been promoted as an integral part of community infrastructure, and community artwork depicting the local way of life has been put on display at stations. Students of local art colleges have also designed decorative murals at Metro stations, while pillars of the viaduct on some elevated sections have been decorated with mosaic murals created by local schoolchildren. The Metro station at INA Colony has a gallery showcasing artwork and handicrafts from across India, while all stations on the Central Secretariat – Qutub Minar section of the Yellow Line have panels installed on the monumental architectural heritage of Delhi. The Nobel Memorial Wall at Rajiv Chowk has portraits of the seven Nobel Laureates from India: Rabindranath Tagore, CV Raman, Hargobind Khorana, Mother Teresa, Subrahmanyan Chandrasekhar, Amartya Sen and Venkatraman Ramakrishnan and provide details about their contribution to society with separate panels on Alfred Nobel and the Nobel Prizes.

Awards 

 Delhi Metro Rail Corporation won the Golden Peacock Environment Management Award 2005.
 Delhi Metro Rail Corporation became the first Indian company to bag the World Green Building Council award for demonstrating "Industry Leadership in Sustainability".
 Delhi Metro Rail Corporation won the PSU of the Year Award from the All India Management Association (AIMA), in 2016.
 Delhi Metro Rail Corporation won the Japan International Cooperation Agency (JICA) President's Award 2012.

In popular culture
Many films have been shot in Delhi Metro. The first-ever movie to be shot in Delhi metro was Bewafaa in November 2003. Later, Delhi-6, Love Aaj Kal,PK,Paa were few popular films that have sequences shot inside Delhi metro trains and station premises. In March 2014, the shooting of Hrithik Roshan and Katrina Kaif starrer film Bang Bang! was done near Mayur Vihar Extension metro station. In 2019, Hrithik Roshan and Tiger Shroff starrer film War was one of the last films to be shot in Delhi metro.

See also
 Urban rail transit in India
 List of Delhi Metro stations
 Delhi Suburban Railway
 Transport in Delhi
 National Capital Region Transport Corporation
 Delhi Transport Corporation
 Delhi Metro Rail Corporation
 List of suburban and commuter rail systems
 Lists of rapid transit systems
 List of metro systems
 Metro Tunneling Group

Notes

References

Further reading

External links

 
 Delhi Metro route map
 
 Collection of Delhi Metro Images

 
New Delhi
Siemens Mobility projects
Underground rapid transit in India
Railway lines opened in 2002
Transport in Delhi
5 ft 6 in gauge railways in India
Standard gauge railways in India
2002 establishments in Delhi
Automated guideway transit